Aman Hambleton (born 30 December 1992) is a Canadian chess grandmaster. He is a member of the Chessbrahs (a Canadian chess entertainment company), along with other grandmasters such as Eric Hansen (founder), Robin van Kampen, and Yasser Seirawan.

Chess career
Hambleton was born in 1992 in Halifax, Nova Scotia, and learned to play chess at age five. He moved to Toronto at age six, and played in his first tournament in the same year. He attended Woburn Collegiate Institute. 

He earned his international master (IM) title in 2013, and was awarded his grandmaster (GM) title by FIDE in April 2018, becoming Canada's tenth GM. He earned his first GM norm at the UNAM Chess Festival in 2012, while still a FIDE master, but did not achieve the second norm until the Reykjavik Open in April 2017. He had vowed in March 2017 to not shave his beard until he attained the GM title, resulting in a lengthy beard by the time he earned his third GM norm in December 2017. He also won the Canadian Open Chess Championship in July 2017, sharing first with Razvan Preotu on a score of 6½/9. 

Hambleton represented Canada at the 41st Chess Olympiad. On the reserve board, he scored 3½/7 (+2–2=3). He played on the reserve board again at the 43rd Chess Olympiad. He lost to the 1937-rated Rijendra Rajbhandari in the first round, but won his last four games to finish on 4½/7 (+4–2=1).  Hambleton is the No. 8 ranked Canadian player, with a rating of 2454.

Chess boxing

Hambleton had a chess boxing contest with IM Lawrence Trent on 11 December 2022. Chess.com described it as "the highest-rated chessboxing match in history". Hambleton won via technical knockout in the first round of the boxing portion of the match.

References

External links
 
 
 
 

1992 births
Living people
Canadian chess players
Chess grandmasters
Chess Olympiad competitors
Sportspeople from Halifax, Nova Scotia
Sportspeople from Toronto